Lawrence J. Timmerman Airport , known locally as Timmerman Field, is an airport in Milwaukee, Wisconsin, United States, owned by Milwaukee County. Located 5 miles (8 km) northwest of the city center, it is used mainly for general or private aviation. It is included in the Federal Aviation Administration (FAA) National Plan of Integrated Airport Systems for 2023–2027, in which it is categorized as a regional reliever airport facility.

History 
The airport was built in 1929 and dedicated on July 6, 1930, one of 25 such projects in U.S. cities by the newly incorporated airplane manufacturer Curtiss-Wright. The airport was originally known as Curtiss-Wright Field, hence the letters "WC" in its airport codes. In 1945, Curtiss-Wright sold it to Fliteways, Inc., the airport's property manager since 1936. It was host to the Experimental Aircraft Association's earliest Fly-In Conventions from 1953 to 1958. The airport was renamed in July 1959 for Lawrence J. Timmerman (1878–1959), chairman of the Milwaukee County Board of Supervisors from 1936 to 1959.

Current users
Lawrence J. Timmerman Airport currently serves various general aviation groups. The current fixed-base operator is Spring City Aviation. The airport is home to the Milwaukee chapter of Youth and Aviation, as well as two Civil Air Patrol squadrons: the Timmerman Composite Squadron and the Milwaukee Senior Support Squadron 10. The airport also serves many private and public users.

Facilities and aircraft 
It also has two turf runways: 15R/33L measuring 3,231 x 270 ft (985 x 82 m) and 4R/22L measuring 2,839 x 270 ft (865 x 82 m).

For the 12-month period ending August 31, 2020, the airport had 36,717 aircraft operations, an average of 101 per day: 97% general aviation, 2% military and just less than 1% air taxi. In January 2023, there were 95 aircraft based at this airport: 82 single-engine, 9 multi-engine, 3 jet and 1 helicopter.

Accidents & Incidents 
On May 26, 2022, a Cessna 152 crashed while on a training flight at Timmerman. The student pilot in control of the plane was doing solo landing practice when he reported engine trouble and crashed in a yard near the airport. The pilot received fatal injuries.

See also 
 List of airports in Wisconsin

References

External links 
 Wisconsin Airport Directory: 
 

Airports in Wisconsin
Buildings and structures in Milwaukee
Transportation in Milwaukee
Airports established in 1929